Judgement Day is a 1949 Czechoslovak comedy film directed by Karel Steklý. The film starred Josef Kemr.

Cast
 Ladislav Pešek as Frantisek Kalous
 Josef Beyvl as Vojtech Stepán
 Jiřina Šejbalová as Málinka
 Helena Růžičková as Cilka
 Jaroslav Mareš as JUDr. Jan Zvonar
 František Vnouček as Honzícek
 Ota Motycka as Suk
 Jan Brandýs as Koudel

References

External links
 

1949 films
1940s Czech-language films
Films directed by Karel Steklý
1949 comedy films
Czechoslovak comedy films
Czechoslovak black-and-white films
1940s Czech films